Lloyd Handley is a Welsh screenwriter and film director. His feature film Third Row Centre won the Best Feature Film award at the 2014 Madrid International Film Festival.

References

External links
 

1987 births
Living people
Welsh film directors
Welsh screenwriters
Welsh writers
Alumni of the University of the Arts London
British film directors
People from Wrexham